William Thomas Gregg (born July 29, 1963) is an American former Major League Baseball (MLB) outfielder/first baseman who played for the Pittsburgh Pirates, Atlanta Braves, Cincinnati Reds, and Florida Marlins from 1987 to 1997, and who is currently the hitting coach for the independent Lincoln Saltdogs.

Amateur career
He attended Wake Forest University, where he studied psychology. In 1983, he played collegiate summer baseball with the Orleans Cardinals of the Cape Cod Baseball League and was named a league all-star.

Professional career
He played in the majors from 1987 to 1997 for the Pittsburgh Pirates, Atlanta Braves, Cincinnati Reds, and Florida Marlins. He mostly played as an outfielder.

Coaching career
He formerly served as the hitting coach for the Omaha Storm Chasers. Gregg was named as the hitting coach for the New Orleans Baby Cakes in the Miami Marlins organization for the 2018 and 2019 seasons. He became hitting coach of the Lincoln Saltdogs in January 2021.

References

External links

Pura Pelota (Venezuelan Winter League)

1963 births
Living people
American expatriate baseball players in Mexico
Atlanta Braves players
Baseball players from North Carolina
Buffalo Bisons (minor league) players
Charlotte Knights players
Cincinnati Reds players
Diablos Rojos del México players 
Florida Marlins players
Harrisburg Senators players
Indianapolis Indians players
Macon Pirates players
Major League Baseball first basemen
Major League Baseball right fielders
Memphis Redbirds
Nashua Pirates players
Navegantes del Magallanes players
American expatriate baseball players in Venezuela
Orleans Firebirds players
People from Peachtree City, Georgia
People from Boone, North Carolina
Pittsburgh Pirates players
Richmond Braves players
Sportspeople from the Atlanta metropolitan area
Wake Forest Demon Deacons baseball players